Andrew Nathan Davis, Jr. (July 28, 1927 – December 22, 2007) was an American football defensive back in the National Football League for the Washington Redskins.  He played college football at George Washington University and was drafted in the second round of the 1952 NFL Draft.

External links

1927 births
2007 deaths
American football defensive backs
Players of American football from Washington, D.C.
George Washington Colonials football players
Washington Redskins players